Linghai is a county-level city in the west of Liaoning province, Northeast China. It was called Jinxian or Jin County until 1993, when it was reorganized to a county-level city and renamed Linghai.

Administrative divisions
There are three subdistricts, 11 towns, seven townships, and one ethnic township under the city's administration.

Subdistricts:
Dalinghe Subdistrict, Jincheng Subdistrict

Towns:
Shishan, Yuji, Shuangyang, Banjita, Shenjiatai, Santaizi, Youwei Manchu Town, Yanjia, Xinzhuangzi, Niangniangguan, Cuiyan

Townships:
Daye Township, Xibaqian Township, Jianye Township, Wendilou Manchu Ethnic Township, Baitaizi Township, Xietun Township, Antun Township, Banshigou Township

Others:
Dayou Farm

Transportation

Railway
Linghai is served by Linghai South railway station, an infill station on the Qinhuangdao–Shenyang passenger railway and the southern terminus of the Chaoyang–Linghai high-speed railway.

Airport
Jinzhou Bay Airport is located here.

References

External links

County-level divisions of Liaoning
Jinzhou